Kevin William Clarke (25 June 1931 – 31 October 2009) was an Australian rules footballer who played for West Perth in the West Australian Football League (WAFL) and Melbourne and Carlton in the Victorian Football League (VFL).

References

External links
Kevin Clarke at Blueseum

Kevin Clarke's playing statistics from WAFL Footy Facts

1931 births
2009 deaths
Melbourne Football Club players
Carlton Football Club players
Australian rules footballers from Western Australia
West Perth Football Club players